The Multnomah County Central Courthouse serves as the courthouse for Multnomah County, Oregon. It is located in downtown Portland, Oregon, the county seat. It opened in October 2020, replacing a nearby building that had been constructed between 1909 and 1914.

Ground was broken on the project to build the new courthouse in October 2016, at which time it was scheduled to be completed in 2020 and cost $300 million. The building opened to the public on October 5, 2020.

See also
 List of tallest buildings in Portland, Oregon
 Veritable Quandary

References

External links

2020 establishments in Oregon
County courthouses in Oregon
Government buildings completed in 2020
Government buildings in Portland, Oregon